Uno is a 2004 Norwegian drama film, directed by Aksel Hennie, who also stars in it. The film was hailed by critics, and won Hennie an Amanda Award for Best Director.

Plot
The film centers around a group of young men who reside in an area of Oslo that is predominantly inhabited by immigrants. Best friends David and Morten work as gym instructors at Jarle's gym. Jarle is a sadistic small-time criminal, who, together with his son Lars, purchases and distributes anabolic steroids. Lars has ties with a notorious criminal Pakistani gang led by Khuram. The climax of the film takes place after Lars, Morten and David are arrested for possession of illegal drugs. David chooses to "snitch" on his friends in order to visit his dying father. The story escalates when Lars uses his influence on the Pakistani gang to retaliate. Lars also informs Khuram about Morten's alleged sexual intercourse with Khuram's sister, viewed as dishonourable by the Sharia law. The plot leaves the two best friends in a series of events that force them to run for their lives.

Cast
Aksel Hennie as David
Nicolai Cleve Broch as Morten
Bjørn Floberg as Jarle
Espen Juul Kristiansen as Kjetil
Ahmed Zeyan as Khuram
Martin Skaug as Lars

References

External links

2004 films
2000s Norwegian-language films
2004 drama films
Norwegian drama films